Andrew Kenneth Marshall (born January 17, 1984) is an American soccer player.

Career

College
Marshall grew up in Ellicott City, Maryland, attended Centennial High School, where he played both soccer and lacrosse, leading his lacrosse team to the 2003 Maryland state championship.  He played college soccer at Towson University, where he started all 76 games of his college career. He was named Freshman of the Year in 2003, and captained the team in his senior year to a national ranking of 15th.

Professional
Marshall turned professional with Crystal Palace Baltimore in the USL Second Division in 2007, and made his professional debut on April 20, 2007, in Baltimore's first ever game, a 4–1 loss to the Charlotte Eagles.

Although he did not score in league play in 2008, Marshall did score a goal in the team's 2-0 upset of Major League Soccer side New York Red Bulls in the third round of the 2008 U.S. Open Cup. On March 16, 2010, Baltimore announced the re-signing of Marshall to a new contract for the 2010 season. On March 11, 2011, the Harrisburg City Islanders announced the signing of Marshall to a contract for the 2011 season.  He played in the MISL with the Norfolk Sharx for the 2011-12 indoor season.  After two seasons with the City Islanders, Marshall signed with the PASL Harrisburg Heat.
March 2013, Marshall signed with the Pittsburgh Riverhounds.

Career statistics
(correct as of 19 September 2010)

Honors
USL Pro All-League Second Team: 2013

References

External links
 Crystal Palace Baltimore bio

1984 births
Living people
American soccer players
Towson Tigers men's soccer players
Crystal Palace Baltimore players
Penn FC players
Pittsburgh Riverhounds SC players
People from Winfield, Illinois
Soccer players from Illinois
Sportspeople from DuPage County, Illinois
USL Second Division players
USSF Division 2 Professional League players
USL Championship players
Association football defenders
Major Indoor Soccer League (2008–2014) players
Professional Arena Soccer League players
Harrisburg Heat (MASL) players